Wariyapola is a town in the Kurunegala District, North Western province, Sri Lanka. Wariyapola is mostly known by sri Lankans because of the Wariyapola Sri Sumangala Tero, who  take down the Union Jack and re-hoisting the Sinhalese lion flag, before the convention that handed over control of the island to the British in 1815.

Wariyapola in Sinhalese means “place for plane landing”, and is believed to be one of the landing sites of Ravana’s chariot or vimana, Dandu Monara Yanthraya.

Public Transport
Wariyapola is situated in between Kurunegala and Padeniya Junction, where the Puttalam and Anuradhapura roads intersect. So most of the people from Anuradhapura, Mahawa, Galgamuwa, Puttalam, Anamaduwa, Nikaweratiya areas pass through Wariyapola in order to reach Kurunegala or Colombo.

Public Schools
 Ghanodaya M. M. V
 Isipathana M. M. V Bamunakotuwa
 Mahakeliya Maha Vidyalaya
 Navinna School
 Sri Sumangala M. M. V (National School)
 Tissa M. M. V Katupotha
 Wariyapola Sri Sumangala Piriwena (Bhikkhu School)

Notable Individuals
 Wariyapola Sri Sumangala Thero
 S. B. Nawinne - Member of Parliament - Kurunegala (1989–1999, 2001–present)
 Amara Piyaseeli Ratnayake - 9th Governor of North Western Province, Member of Parliament - Kurunegala (1989-2010)
 D. B. Herath - Member of Parliament - Kurunegala (2019–present)

Religions

The majority of the people in Wariyapola are Buddhists, with both Christians and Muslims also living in these area. Wariyapola Sri Sumangala Pirewena, Sri Visuddarama Piriwena are Wellagala Rajamaha Vihara are most famous among Buddhist temples and there is also a mosque in Wariyapola.

References

External links

Populated places in North Western Province, Sri Lanka